The Moosberg is a 513.0 m high hill in the Solling range, which is located in southwestern  Lower Saxony (Germany).

Geography 

The hill lies in the "Hochsolling", the central and highest part of the Solling, which is surrounded by the Solling-Vogler Nature Park. This heavily wooded hill is a little south of the half way point between Boffzen and Dassel,  as the crow flies, and around 1.5 km east of Neuhaus.

From topographical maps it is clear, for example from trigonometric points that there are three different summit on the Moosberg at 513.0 m (north), 508.7 m (centre) and 508.6 m (south).

On the western slope of the Moosberg is the  Hochsolling Observation Tower.

Sights 

 Hochsolling Observation Tower
 Mecklenbruch (raised bog and nature reserve)
 Neuhaus Deer Park (and forest museum)

Hills of Lower Saxony
Solling